The Canton of Louvigné-du-Désert is a former canton of France, in the Ille-et-Vilaine département, in the northeast of the department. It had 8,596 inhabitants (2012). It was disbanded following the French canton reorganisation which came into effect in March 2015. It consisted of 8 communes, which joined the canton of Fougères-2 in 2015.

The canton contained the following communes:
 Louvigné-du-Désert 
 Saint-Georges-de-Reintembault 
 La Bazouge-du-Désert 
 Mellé
 Le Ferré 
 Poilley 
 Villamée 
 Monthault

References

Former cantons of Ille-et-Vilaine
2015 disestablishments in France
States and territories disestablished in 2015